The Riwŏn Line is a partially electrified standard-gauge secondary line of the Korean State Railway in South Hamgyŏng Province, North Korea, running from Riwŏn Ch'ŏlsan to Ch'aho, via the Rahŭng−Chŭngsan section of the P'yŏngra Line.

History
On 20 September 1929, the Chosen Government Railway (Sentetsu) opened three new lines: the Pukch'ŏng Line, the Ch'ŏlsan Line from Rahŭng on the Hamgyŏng Line to Riwŏn Ch'ŏlsan (not to be confused with the present-day Ch'ŏlsan Line that connects to the P'yŏngŭi Line), and the Ch'aho Line from Chŭngsan on the Hamgyŏng Line to Ch'aho.

After the Korean State railway merged the Hamgyŏng Line, the Ch'ŏngra Line, and the northern section of the former Kyŏngwŏn Line to create the P'yŏngra Line, it combined the Ch'aho and Ch'ŏlsan lines to create the current Riwŏn Line, with the newly formed line sharing the Rahŭng−Chŭngsan section with the P'yŏngra Line.

Route
A yellow background in the "Distance" box indicates that section of the line is not electrified.

References

Railway lines in North Korea
Standard gauge railways in North Korea